David Castellanos (born February 26, 1980) is a retired American soccer player who played professionally in Honduras, Major League Soccer and the USL First Division.  He was the assistant coach of the Drexel University men's soccer team. He is currently the Head Coach of Chestnut Hill College men's soccer team.

Player
Born in Virginia, Castellanos grew up in Philadelphia, Pennsylvania.  In 1998, he graduated from Christopher Dock Mennonite High School.  In 1998, Castellanos began his collegiate career at Mercer County Community College.  In 2000, he transferred to the University of Connecticut.  That season, the Huskies won the 2000 NCAA Division I Men's Soccer Championship with Castellanos assisting on the Huskies second goal.  Castellanos graduated with a bachelor's degree in sociology.  In 2002, Castellanos turned professional with F.C. Motagua in the Liga Nacional de Fútbol Profesional de Honduras.  On March 30, 2004, the Colorado Rapids of Major League Soccer, signed Castellanos.  He played three games, then was released on June 11, 2004.  On June 23, 2004, the Minnesota Thunder signed him to a two-year contract.  In 2005, he played for the Virginia Beach Mariners.  On November 9, 2005, Castellanos moved indoors with the Philadelphia KiXX of the second Major Indoor Soccer League.  Castellanos played for the KiXX until the team ceased operations in 2010.  During that time, the KiXX won the 2007 MISL championship.

Coach
In August 2006, Castellanos became coach of Penn State Abington men’s and women’s soccer teams.

USL Premier Development League side Reading United A.C. named Castellanos as the club's head coach on December 28, 2013. He left his post as head coach after the 2015 season.

Castellanos became the Head Coach for the Chestnut Hill College men's soccer team spring of 2023.

References

External links
 
 Penn State Abington: David Castellanos

Living people
1980 births
American soccer players
American expatriate soccer players
F.C. Motagua players
Colorado Rapids players
UConn Huskies men's soccer players
Major League Soccer players
Major Indoor Soccer League (2001–2008) players
Major Indoor Soccer League (2008–2014) players
Philadelphia KiXX players
A-League (1995–2004) players
USL First Division players
Virginia Beach Mariners players
Soccer players from Virginia
Expatriate footballers in Honduras
Association football midfielders
Association football forwards
American expatriate sportspeople in Honduras
USL League Two coaches
College men's soccer coaches in the United States
College women's soccer coaches in the United States